The Tennille Baptist Church in Tennille, Georgia is a Southern Baptist church that was built in 1903.  It was designed by architect Charles E. Choate in Gothic architecture. Choate was an architect and Methodist minister who lived in Tennille for many years and designed several buildings in the community.

The church was nominated for National Register of Historic Places listing as part of a multiple property listing, and was itself listed on the U.S. National Register of Historic Places in 1994.

References

External links
Tennille Baptist Church historic postcard (postmarked 1907)
Tennille Baptist Church Church4religion blog
Flickr image

Churches on the National Register of Historic Places in Georgia (U.S. state)
Gothic Revival church buildings in Georgia (U.S. state)
Churches completed in 1903
20th-century Baptist churches in the United States
Buildings and structures in Washington County, Georgia
Baptist churches in Georgia (U.S. state)
National Register of Historic Places in Washington County, Georgia
Southern Baptist Convention churches